Scopula inductata, the soft-lined wave, is a moth of the family Geometridae. It was described by Achille Guenée in 1857. It is found in North America,  from Newfoundland to the coast of British Columbia, north to the Northwest Territories, south to Alabama and Utah.

The wings are light yellowish gray, crossed by several gray wavy lines. The outer edges of the wings are rounded. There is a black dot present near the middle of each wing. Adults are on wing from July to September.

The larvae feed on Aster, Trifolium, Taraxacum, Ambrosia and Melilotus species.

References

External links

Moths described in 1857
inductata
Taxa named by Achille Guenée
Moths of North America